Rebecca Fjelland Davis is an American novelist and children's book author who lives in Minnesota. She is currently an instructor at South Central College in Mankato, where she teaches Composition studies, Literature and Film, and Critical Thinking in Humanities.

Biography

Davis grew up on a farm outside Huxley, Iowa. She graduated with honors from Waldorf College, St. Cloud State University (earning her Bachelor of Arts in English) and from Minnesota State University, Mankato (earning her Master of Fine Arts in Creative Writing). A former marathoner and two-time women's champion of the National 24-Hour Challenge cycling event, she has been known to work athletic themes into her young adult writing, similar to her former husband Terry Davis.

Books
10, 9, 8 Polar Animals: A Counting Backward Book. Capstone Press, 2006. .
Beaches and Bicycles: A Summer Counting Book. Capstone Press, 2006. .
Chasing AllieCat. Flux, 2011. .
Counting Pets by Twos. Capstone Press, 2006. .
Flowers and Showers: A Spring Counting Book. Capstone Press, 2006. .
Footballs and Falling Leaves: A Fall Counting Book. Capstone Press, 2006. .
Jake Riley: Irreparably Damaged. HarperTempest, 2003. .
The History of the Washington Mystics (Women's Pro Basketball Today). Creative Education, 1999. .
[http://www.capstoneyoungreaders.com/search/?Keyword=Beauty%20Missing%20Hair%20hissing Medusa Tells All: Beauty Missing, Hair Hissing (The Other Side of Myth)]. Capstone Press, 2014. 
More or Less: A Rainforest Counting Book. Capstone Press, 2006. .
Snowflakes and Ice Skates: A Winter Counting Book. Capstone Press, 2006. .
Woof & Wag: Bringing Home a Dog. Picture Window Books, 2008. .
Zoo Animals: 1,2,3. Capstone Press, 2006. .

Anthologies
Wonderful Things I Scarcely Understand: Twenty Years of Robert Wright Award Winners. Edited by Roger Sheffer. Minnesota State University, Mankato, 2003. .
Girl Meets Boy: Because There are Two Sides to Every Story. Edited by Kelly Milner Halls. Chronicle, 2012. .

Awards
 1990 Robert Wright Creative Writing Contest Winner. Minnesota State University, Mankato.
 2003 Blue Ribbon Award Winner (for Jake Riley: Irreparably Damaged), The Bulletin of the Center for Children's Books.
 2007 Honorable Mention Award (for Chasing AllieCat, a work-in-progress YA novel), Loft Awards for Children's Literature /Older Children.
 2008 Artist Initiative Grant (for Slider's Son, work-in-progress middle grade novel), Minnesota State Arts Board.
 2011 Junior Library Guild Selection -- Chasing AllieCat
 2017 Prairie Lakes Regional Arts Council Mid-Career Artist Grant (for Slider's Son publication promotion)

References

External links
Rebecca Fjelland Davis' Homepage
Official author blog

1956 births
21st-century American novelists
American children's writers
Living people
Novelists from Minnesota
People from Story County, Iowa
People from Mankato, Minnesota
St. Cloud State University alumni
Waldorf University alumni
Minnesota State University, Mankato alumni
American women novelists
21st-century American women writers